The Beethovenfest (Beethoven Festival) is a festival of classical music in Bonn, Germany, dedicated mostly to the music of Ludwig van Beethoven who was born there. It dates back to 1845, when the composer's 75th anniversary of birth was celebrated with unveiling his monument and performing major works.

First held irregularly, it is now an annual event, presenting around 70 concerts of international orchestras, ensembles and soloists in more than 20 venues in the town and the region.

History 
The Beethovenfest was first held in 1845, when a festival of three days celebrated the 75th anniversary of the composer's birth. The Beethoven monument was unveiled on 12 August 1845 as part of the festivities, which were attended by the Prussian king Friedrich Wilhelm IV, the British Queen Victoria, Alexander von Humboldt, and Hector Berlioz. Among the conductors then were Franz Liszt and Louis Spohr, who conducted the Missa solemnis and the Ninth Symphony. In 1894, all nine symphonies were performed for the first time.

From 1931 the festival was held annually, soon taken over by the Nazis. After World War II, the town took responsibility for the festival. From 1947, it was held biennially, with chamber music performed the other years. The present Beethovenhalle, which followed two wooden structures of the same name, was opened in 1959 and made the festival one of the important international festivals. From 1974, the festival was held every third year, and music by Beethoven was contrasted with contemporary music.

From 1998, the town organized the festival, now annually, in collaboration with the broadcaster Deutsche Welle. The festival cooperates with the Beethoven Orchester Bonn, the Bonn Opera and the Beethoven-Haus.

2015 was the first festival directed by Nike Wagner. She dropped several Beethoven symphonies from the program, including the Ninth, while placing more emphasis on chamber music.

The theme of the 2016 festival were revolutions, presented in 59 performances at 23 venues in Bonn and the region. It was opened by a concert of the Czech Philharmonic with the violinist Hilary Hahn. Related to the French Revolution and the Russian Revolution, one focus is on music from France and Russia. Beethoven's opera Fidelio was complemented by another "Rettungsoper" (rescue opera), Cherubini's Les deux journées conducted by Christoph Spering.

The main focus of the festival

2005

The festival took place from 8 September until 2 October. The theme was Liberté - the keyword of the enlightenment and battle cry of the French Revolution. After the Bohemian-Moravian focus in the previous year, the organizers emphasise this time on the relation between Beethoven and French music. In 64 events and an extensive schedule, the festival offered an insight of major importance, which had revolutionary ideas and changes on Beethoven and his music, but emphasised the creativity of the French composers such as Hector Berlioz, Claude Debussy and Maurice Ravel.

2006

The Beethovenfest took place in Bonn from 31 August until 1 October. The programm was themed Russia.

2007

The Beethovenfest Bonn took place in 2007 from 24 August to 23 September. The organizers dedicated it to the music nation of Great Britain. The festival was themed Joy. Ludwig van Beethoven's relation with Great Britain was based to a large extent on old Bonn relations: Ferdinand Ries, born in Bonn like Beethoven and one of the Beethoven's piano students in Vienna, went to London in 1813 as a celebrated pianist. Later he became one of the directors of the London Philharmonic Society, which in 1822 commissioned Beethoven's Ninth Symphony.

British ensembles such as the BBC Symphony Orchestra, the Academy of St Martin in the Fields or the Philharmonia Orchestra of London performed in Bonn. Also the War Requiem by Benjamin Britten was part of the program. In addition, some discoveries were announced, such as a selection of Beethoven's Scottish, Irish and Welsh songs, which were rarely performed.

On 2 September, the opera Freax by Moritz Eggert premiered at the festival.

2008

The Beethovenfest took place this year from 29 August to 28 September in Beethoven's birthplace. Power. Music. - this was the theme of the festival including 60 concerts based on Beethoven's political legacy, the ideological appropriation and exclusion of classical music composers and their works in the 20th century. The Beethoven's works, which he wrote with political and social connotations, were heard. On the one hand, these were juxtaposed with compositions that arose as a reaction to political currents; on the other hand, the 2008 edition of the Beethovenfest was dedicated to out-of-date composers whose music was produced, inter alia, in Theresienstadt and works that are in the context of exile and persecution.

Top-class musicians such as Hélène Grimaud, Annette Dasch, Claudia Barainsky, Daniel Hope, Martin Grubinger and András Schiff, Max Raabe and The Princes performed, and from the acting industry Esther Schweins, Hannelore Elsner, Christoph Waltz, Ulrich Matthes and Hanns Zischler.

In addition, top orchestras performed at the Beethovenfest Bonn 2008, such as the New York Philharmonic Orchestra, Lorin Maazel conducting, the London Symphony Orchestra conducted by Daniel Harding, the National Orchestra of France, conducted by Kurt Masur, the Gewandhaus Orchestra, conductor Riccardo Chailly, the Deutsche Kammerphilharmonie Bremen, Paavo Järvi conducting, and the Bamberg Symphony conducted by Jonathan Nott.

2009

The Beethovenfest took place from 4 September to 3 October 2009. In the Light was the theme of the festival this year. "Beethoven's influence coined not only the music of the Romantic period, in which almost all musical genres are based on Beethoven's work," wrote the artistic director of the Beethovenfest, Ilona Schmiel. "Likewise, during Beethoven's lifetime, the soloist developed as an increasingly independent musical personality. This was the starting point for the artistic ideal of the Romantic period: the cult of the stars and genius that characterizes our music world today."

In this context, the theme In the Light means that the focus is on artistic positions. The 2009 programm of the festival included artists such as Paavo Järvi and The Deutsche Kammerphilharmonie Bremen, Kent Nagano, Ingo Metzmacher, Sol Gabetta, Valery Gergiev, Gustavo Dudamel and Maurizio Pollini.

2010

The Beethovenfest took place in 2010 from 10 September to 9 October and was themed Open - utopia and freedom in music. José Antonio Abreu, founder of the Venezuelan "El Sistema", the national system of youth and children's orchestras of Venezuela, had the patronage. The Federal Chancellery could be used as a venue for a concert for the first time.

As part of the Bavarian State Orchestra's concert from 12 September, the conductor Kent Nagano received the Wilhelm Furtwängler Prize of the Beethovenfest Bonn.

2011

In the Liszt year, the Beethovenfest looked back on its long tradition: in 1845 Franz Liszt organized a three-day music festival for the inauguration of the Beethoven monument on Münsterplatz on the occasion of the 75th birthday of the composer. In 2011, the festival took place from 10 September to 9 October. It was under the theme Future music. Beethoven, Liszt and the New in music.

2012

Under the theme Obstinacy. On the True in Art , the Beethovenfest took place in 2012 from 7 September to 7 October. The focus was on musicians who, like Beethoven, are ahead of time with their ideas and are undaunted on their own way. With these border crossers, many of whom have been closely associated with the festival for years, the Beethovenfest is developing exclusive programs.

2013

The 2013 edition of the Beethovenfest took place from 5 September to 5 October. The 67 individual events were under the theme Transformations. The main program included an open-air concert, in which Otto Sauter and his trumpet ensemble Ten of the Best & Friends translated well-known melodies from operas into American and Caribbean styles during the Richard Wagner anniversary year, as well as an English promenade concert with soprano Miah Persson and the for the first time NDR Youth Symphony Orchestra conducted by its founder Thomas Hengelbrock.

References

External links 
 
 Boris Berezovsky: Beethoven is as powerful as the sun Deutsche Welle
 

Music festivals established in 1987
Classical music festivals in Germany
Recurring events established in 1845
1845 establishments in Germany
Ludwig van Beethoven